Marta Blanco (1938 - 2020), was a Chilean writer and journalist.

Early life 
Blanco was born in 1938 in Viña del Mar.

Personal life
Blanco was married to Enrique Lafourcade. She was his second wife and they were together for seven years. He had been married to Chilean-born Canadian artist Maria Luisa Segnoret and he went on to marry Chilean painter Rossana Pizarro Garcia.

Books 

 The Generation Of The Leaves, Zig-Zag, 1965.
 Everything Is A Lie, Editora Brocal, 1974 - contains 13 stories,
 Bluegirl 
 The disappearance of Eleodoro 
 Gath & Chávez 
 Golden wedding 
 The general's feast 
 Roast chickens 
 A paper crown 
 Motel 
 The artist consoled 
 Presence 
 Maternity 
 Optical One: She thought she was thinking about it  
 Optics two: Mirage
 For The Left Hand, Caos Ediciones, 1990; contains 12 stories,

 Japanese Towels 
 Fueguina 
 Chu Yuan's iniquities 
 Walk 
 Flatterer 
 Moon that breaks 
 Dark honeysuckle affair 
 The Lord have mercy on Schtodt 
 The saccade of the nuns 
 The representative of the fourth part of the universe 
 By Eye 
 Interrogation by chosen people who know

 Maradentro, Alfaguara, Santiago, 1997.
 La Emperrada, Alfaguara, Santiago, 2001.
 Whale Memory, Uqbar, Santiago, 2009

Awards 

 Story Contest of the magazine Paula 1975.
 Story Contest of the magazine Paula 1980.
 Cuentos de El Mercurio Award 1995.
 Tales of El Mercurio Award 1997.
 Erotic Tales Award 2005 (Caras magazine).
 Critics Award 2009 (Círculo de Críticos de Arte de Chile) for Memory of whales .

References 

1938 births
2020 deaths
20th-century Chilean women writers
Chilean journalists
20th-century Chilean novelists
Chilean women novelists
Chilean women journalists
People from Viña del Mar
21st-century Chilean women writers
21st-century Chilean novelists